Look at the King in the Moon (French: Regarde le roi dans la lune) is a 2011 film directed by Nabyl Lahlou. It was screened at the Cairo International Film Festival.

Synopsis 
Tortured by policemen seeking to extract confessions from him about his shady association with a certain William Shakespeare, Fettah Aberkane falls into a coma. In his agony, he imagines the film he has always dreamed of making.

Cast 

 Sophia Hadi
 Nabyl Lahlou
 Mehdi Piro
 Houssam Benkhadra
 Ilias Boujendar
 Bakr Fekkak

External links

References 

2011 films
Moroccan drama films
2010s Arabic-language films
Films directed by Nabyl Lahlou